Nord-Trøndelag is one of the 19 multi-member constituencies of the Storting, the national legislature of Norway. The constituency was established in 1921 following the introduction of proportional representation for elections to the Storting. It consists of the municipalities of Flatanger, Frosta, Grong, Høylandet, Inderøy, Leka, Levanger, Lierne, Meråker, Nærøysund, Namsos, Namsskogan, Overhalla, Raarvihke, Snåase, Steinkjer, Stjørdal and Verdal in the county of Trøndelag. The constituency currently elects four of the 169 members of the Storting using the open party-list proportional representation electoral system. At the 2021 parliamentary election it had 100,638 registered electors.

Electoral system
Nord-Trøndelag currently elects four of the 169 members of the Storting using the open party-list proportional representation electoral system. Constituency seats are allocated by the County Electoral Committee using the Modified Sainte-Laguë method. Compensatory seats (seats at large) are calculated based on the national vote and are allocated by the National Electoral Committee using the Modified Sainte-Laguë method at the constituency level (one for each constituency). Only parties that reach the 4% national threshold compete for compensatory seats.

Election results

Summary

(Excludes compensatory seats. Figures in italics represent joint lists.)

Detailed

2020s

2021
Results of the 2021 parliamentary election held on 13 September 2021:

The following candidates were elected:
Marit Arnstad (Sp); Ingvild Kjerkol (Ap); André N. Skjelstad (V); Terje Sørvik (Ap); and Per Olav Tyldum (Sp).

2010s

2017
Results of the 2017 parliamentary election held on 11 September 2017:

The following candidates were elected:
Elin Rodum Agdestein (H); Marit Arnstad (Sp); Arild Grande (Ap); Ingvild Kjerkol (Ap); and André N. Skjelstad (V).

2013
Results of the 2013 parliamentary election held on 8 and 9 September 2013:

The following candidates were elected:
Elin Rodum Agdestein (H); Marit Arnstad (Sp); Arild Grande (Ap); Ingvild Kjerkol (Ap); and André N. Skjelstad (V).

2000s

2009
Results of the 2009 parliamentary election held on 13 and 14 September 2009:

The following candidates were elected:
Susanne Bratli (Ap); Lars Peder Brekk (Sp); Robert Eriksson (FrP); Arild Grande (Ap); Gerd Janne Kristoffersen (Ap); and Lars Myraune (H).

2005
Results of the 2005 parliamentary election held on 11 and 12 September 2005:

The following candidates were elected:
Lars Peder Brekk (Sp); Robert Eriksson (FrP); Bjarne Håkon Hanssen (Ap); Gerd Janne Kristoffersen (Ap); Inge Ryan (SV); and André N. Skjelstad (V).

2001
Results of the 2001 parliamentary election held on 9 and 10 September 2001:

The following candidates were elected:
Marit Arnstad (Sp); Aud Gaundal (Ap); Bjarne Håkon Hanssen (Ap); Arne Lyngstad (KrF); Inge Ryan (SV); and Per Sandberg (FrP).

1990s

1997
Results of the 1997 parliamentary election held on 15 September 1997:

The following candidates were elected:
Jon Olav Alstad (Ap); Aud Gaundal (Ap); Bjarne Håkon Hanssen (Ap); Johan J. Jakobsen (Sp); Arne Lyngstad (KrF); and Per Sandberg (FrP).

1993
Results of the 1993 parliamentary election held on 12 and 13 September 1993:

The following candidates were elected:
Jon Olav Alstad (Ap); Marit Arnstad (Sp); Aud Gaundal (Ap); Roger Gudmundseth (Ap); Jorunn Hageler (SV); and Johan J. Jakobsen (Sp).

1980s

1989
Results of the 1989 parliamentary election held on 10 and 11 September 1989:

The following candidates were elected:
Per Aunet (SV); Inger Lise Gjørv (Ap); Roger Gudmundseth (Ap); Johan J. Jakobsen (Sp); Wenche Frogn Sellæg (H); and Inge Staldvik (Ap).

1985
Results of the 1985 parliamentary election held on 8 and 9 September 1985:

As the list alliance was entitled to more seats contesting as an alliance than it was contesting as individual parties, the distribution of seats was as list alliance votes. The Sp-KrF-DLF list alliance's additional seat was allocated to the Centre Party.

The following candidates were elected:
Reidar Due (Sp); Inger Lise Gjørv (Ap); Roger Gudmundseth (Ap); Johan J. Jakobsen (Sp); Wenche Frogn Sellæg (H); and Inge Staldvik (Ap).

1981
Results of the 1981 parliamentary election held on 13 and 14 September 1981:

The following candidates were elected:
Reidar Due (Sp-KrF); Inger Lise Gjørv (Ap); Roger Gudmundseth (Ap); Guttorm Hansen (Ap); Johan J. Jakobsen (Sp-KrF); and Gunnar Vada (H).

1970s

1977
Results of the 1977 parliamentary election held on 11 and 12 September 1977:

The following candidates were elected:
Reidar Due (Sp); Inger Lise Gjørv (Ap); Guttorm Hansen (Ap); Johan J. Jakobsen (Sp); Johnny Stenberg (Ap); and Gunnar Vada (H-KrF).

1973
Results of the 1973 parliamentary election held on 9 and 10 September 1973:

The following candidates were elected:
Ottar Gravås (H-KrF); Guttorm Hansen (Ap); Johan J. Jakobsen (Sp-V); Johnny Stenberg (Ap); Johan Støa (Ap); and Johan A. Vikan (Sp-V).

1960s

1969
Results of the 1969 parliamentary election held on 7 and 8 September 1969:

The following candidates were elected:
Inge Einarsen Bartnes (Sp); Leif Granli (Ap); Guttorm Hansen (Ap); Ola H. Kveli (V); Johan Støa (Ap); and Johan A. Vikan (Sp).

1965
Results of the 1965 parliamentary election held on 12 and 13 September 1965:

The following candidates were elected:
Inge Einarsen Bartnes (Sp); Leif Granli (Ap); Guttorm Hansen (Ap); Jon Leirfall (Sp); Bjarne Lyngstad (V); and Johan Støa (Ap).

1961
Results of the 1961 parliamentary election held on 11 September 1961:

The following candidates were elected:
Inge Einarsen Bartnes (Sp), 13,362 votes; Gunvald Engelstad (Ap), 26,629 votes; Leif Granli (Ap), 26,638 votes; Guttorm Hansen (Ap), 26,634 votes; Jon Leirfall (Sp), 13,363 votes; and Bjarne Lyngstad (V), 6,022 votes.

1950s

1957
Results of the 1957 parliamentary election held on 7 October 1957:

The following candidates were elected:
Inge Einarsen Bartnes (Bp); Olav Benum (V); Gunvald Engelstad (Ap); Leif Granli (Ap); Jon Leirfall (Bp); and Gustav Sjaastad (Ap).

1953
Results of the 1953 parliamentary election held on 12 October 1953:

The following candidates were elected:
Inge Einarsen Bartnes (Bp); Olav Benum (V); Gunvald Engelstad (Ap); Leif Granli (Ap); Jon Leirfall (Bp); and Johan Wiik (Ap).

1940s

1949
Results of the 1949 parliamentary election held on 10 October 1949:

The following candidates were elected:
Olav Benum (V); Gunvald Engelstad (Ap); Leif Granli (Ap); Jon Leirfall (Bp); and Johan Wiik (Ap).

1945
Results of the 1945 parliamentary election held on 8 October 1945:

The following candidates were elected:
Olav Benum (V); Gunvald Engelstad (Ap); Leif Granli (Ap); Jon Leirfall (Bp); and Johan Wiik (Ap).

1930s

1936
Results of the 1936 parliamentary election held on 19 October 1936:

As the list alliance was not entitled to more seats contesting as an alliance than it was contesting as individual parties, the distribution of seats was as party votes.

The following candidates were elected:
Ivar Kirkeby-Garstad (Bp); Albert Moen (Ap); Eliseus Müller (Bp); Johan Peter Trøite (V); and Johan Wiik (Ap).

1933
Results of the 1933 parliamentary election held on 16 October 1933:

As the list alliance was not entitled to more seats contesting as an alliance than it was contesting as individual parties, the distribution of seats was as party votes.

The following candidates were elected:
Håkon Five (V); Ivar Kirkeby-Garstad (Bp); Albert Moen (Ap); Eliseus Müller (Bp); and Johan Wiik (Ap).

1930
Results of the 1930 parliamentary election held on 20 October 1930:

The following candidates were elected:
Ivar Kirkeby-Garstad (Bp); Ole H. Langhammer (Bp); Albert Moen (Ap); Anders Todal (V); and Johan Wiik (Ap).

1920s

1927
Results of the 1927 parliamentary election held on 17 October 1927:

The following candidates were elected:
Håkon Five (V); Ivar Kirkeby-Garstad (Bp); Ole H. Langhammer (Bp); Albert Moen (Ap); and Johan Wiik (Ap).

1924
Results of the 1924 parliamentary election held on 21 October 1924:

The following candidates were elected:
Håkon Five (V); Ivar Kirkeby-Garstad (Bp); Ole H. Langhammer (Bp); Albert Moen (Ap); and Johannes Okkenhaug (V).

1921
Results of the 1921 parliamentary election held on 24 October 1921:

The following candidates were elected:
Johannes Bragstad (L); Håkon Five (V); Ivar Kirkeby-Garstad (L); Albert Moen (Ap); and Johannes Okkenhaug (V).

Notes

References

Storting constituency
Storting constituencies
Storting constituencies established in 1921